Diplodina is a genus of fungi belonging to the family Gnomoniaceae.

Species:
 Diplodina acerina
 Diplodina calamagrostidis
 Diplodina grossulariae
 Diplodina moelleriana

References

Gnomoniaceae
Sordariomycetes genera